Oñate is a Basque surname. Notable people with this surname include:

 Cristóbal de Oñate (1504–1567), Spanish conquistador, father of Juan de Oñate
 Eugenio Oñate Ibañez de Navarra (born 1953), Spanish engineer
 Juan de Oñate (1550–1626), New Spanish explorer and colonial governor
 Jorge Oñate (born 1949), Colombian singer and composer
 Santiago Oñate Laborde (born 1949), Mexican lawyer and politician

Basque-language surnames